Bruce Ferguson may refer to:

 Bruce Ferguson (Australian Army officer) (1917–1988), Australian Army officer
 Bruce Ferguson (RNZAF officer) (born 1949), Royal New Zealand Air Force officer
 Bruce Walker Ferguson (born 1954), educator, entrepreneur and lawyer
 Bruce Ferguson (rugby union) (born 1969), Fijian-born Japanese rugby union player
 Bruce K. Ferguson, American landscape architect, author, and educator